Amherst High School may refer to:

In Canada 
Amherst Regional High School (Nova Scotia), Amherst, Nova Scotia

In the United States 
 Amherst High School (Nebraska), Amherst, Nebraska
 Amherst High School (Wisconsin), Amherst, Wisconsin
Amherst Central High School, Amherst, New York
Amherst County High School, Amherst, Virginia
Amherst Regional High School (Massachusetts), Amherst, Massachusetts
Marion L. Steele High School (aka Amherst Steele High School), Amherst, Ohio